Bad Prosecutor is a South Korean television series starring Doh Kyung-soo and Lee Se-hee. It depicts the story of a prosecutor who truly punishes corrupt powers with expedient and trickery. The series aired on KBS2 on October 5 to November 10, 2022, every Wednesday and Thursday at 21:50 (KST) for 12 episodes.

Synopsis
A story about prosecutor named Jin Jeong (Doh Kyung-soo), armed with badness and grittyness, breaking the sanctuary created by wealth and power. He chooses expediency over the law, trick over the standard, and defect over sincerity. He will provide a sense of exhilaration by punishing corrupt officials who are eating away at this society.

Cast

Main
 Doh Kyung-soo as Jin Jeong
 Jung Hyeon-jun as young Jin Jeong
 A prosecutor in the third division of the Central District Prosecutors' Office who stands on the side of the underprivileged.
 Lee Se-hee as Shin A-ra
 A senior prosecutor at the Central District Prosecutors' Office with perfect work skills and social skills.
 Ha Jun as Oh Do-hwan
 A prosecutor at the Central District Prosecutors' Office.

Supporting

People related to Jin Jeong
 Lee Si-eon as Go Joong-do
 A hacker with obscure skills who works with Jin Jeong.
 Kim Sang-ho as Park Jae-kyung
 The head of the Civil Service Office of the Central District Prosecutors' Office.
 Yeon Joon-seok as Lee Chul-ki
 Jin Jeong's loyal and reliable detective.
 Joo Bo-young as Baek Eun-ji
 Daughter of the head of National Organization – White Gompa.

People related to the Central District Prosecutor's Office
 Kim Tae-woo as Kim Tae-ho
 The Chief Prosecutor of the crime department.
 Choi Kwang-il as Lee Jang-won
 Deputy Chief Prosecutor of the Central Prosecutor's Office.
 Yoon Jung-seop as Investigator Park
 He is a veteran who worked with Shin A-ra.
 Hong Eui-jun as Investigator Kang Shin-jo
 Oh Do-hwan's loyal right arm.

People related to Kangsan Law Firm
 Kim Chang-wan as Seo Hyun-gyu
 Representative of Kangsan Law Firm.
 Yoo Hwan as Seo Ji-han
 Son of Seo Hyun-gyu. Heir to Kangsan Law Firm.
 Kim Hi-eo-ra as Director Tae Hyung-wook
 Seo Hyun-gyu's bodyguard and personal secretary.
Kim Jung-young as Jang Jae-Hee
 A professor and Jin Jeong's senior in university.

Others
 Kim Geun-soon as Jin Jeong's mother
 She has a cool personality and Jin Jeong's mother.
 Shin Seung-hwan as Yoo Jin-cheol
 A gangster who runs an entertainment establishment in Gangnam.
 Jeong Jae-won as Min-goo
 The third person in the national organization White Gompa.

Extended
 Lee Hyo-na as Park Ye-young
 The victim of the Seo Cho-dong murder case.
 Lee Woo-sung as Kim Hyo-jun
 A delivery man who has been identified as the culprit in the Seo Cho-dong murder case.

Special appearance 
Lee Jong-hyuk as Jin Kang-woo
 Jin Jeong's father and reporter.
 Keum Kwang-san as Fitness president

Production 
On October 28, 2022, it was reported that filming would end on October 31.

Original soundtrack 

The soundtrack album peaked on number 37 on weekly Circle Album Chart. As of December 2022, 3,400 copies have been sold.

Part 1

Part 2

Part 3

Part 4

Part 5

Part 6

Part 7

Viewership

Accolades

References

External links
  
 Bad Prosecutor at Daum 
 
 
 

Korean-language television shows
Korean Broadcasting System television dramas
South Korean legal television series
2022 South Korean television series debuts
2022 South Korean television series endings
Wavve original programming